Brinkibon Ltd v Stahag Stahl GmbH [1983] 2 AC 34 is a landmark decision of the House of Lords on the formation of a contract using modern communication. The Lords largely accepted the earlier leading decision of Entores v Miles Far East Co. [1955] 2 QB 327 on acceptance via telex.

Facts
Brinkibon was a London company that bought steel from Stahag, a seller based in Austria. Brinkibon sent their acceptance to a Stahag offer by Telex to Vienna. Brinkibon later wanted to issue a writ against Stahag and applied to serve an out of jurisdiction party. They would only be able to do so if the contract had been formed in England.

The question at issue was where the contract was formed.

Judgment
The Judges decided that the contract was formed in Vienna. They accepted the principle in Entores v Miles Far East Co where in the case of instantaneous communication, which included telex, the formation generally occurs in the place where the acceptance is received.

Lord Wilberforce, however, did not see the rule as applying in all circumstances:

Lord Brandon said the following.

See also
English contract law

References

House of Lords cases
English agreement case law
Lord Wilberforce cases
1982 in British law
1982 in case law